The final tournament was held in Japan from 29 September to 20 October 2022. Serbia won their first world title, defeating Italy in five sets at the final.

First round

<div style="overflow-x: auto; white-space: nowrap;">

Pool A 

|}
Total matches played : 15
Total sets played : 49 (3.27 per match)
Total points played : 2,167 (145 per match)

Pool B 

|}
Total matches played : 15
Total sets played : 50 (3.33 per match)
Total points played : 2,139 (143 per match)

Pool C 

|}
Total matches played : 15
Total sets played : 57 (3.80 per match)
Total points played : 2,422 (161 per match)

Pool D 

|}
Total matches played : 15
Total sets played : 45 (3.00 per match)
Total points played : 1,898 (127 per match)

Second round

Pool E 

|}
Total matches played : 16
Total sets played : 60 (3.75 per match)
Total points played : 2,603 (163 per match)

Pool F 

|}
Total matches played : 16
Total sets played : 56 (3.50 per match)
Total points played : 2,453 (153 per match)

Third round

Pool G 

|}
Total matches played : 3
Total sets played : 12 (4.00 per match)
Total points played : 531 (177 per match)

Pool H 

|}
Total matches played : 3
Total sets played : 14 (4.67 per match)
Total points played : 592 (197 per match)

Final round

Total matches played*  : 5
Total sets played* : 21 (4.20 per match)
Total points played* : 934 (187 per match)
* (inc. 5th place match)

Tournament statistics

Host cities
Japan : Yokohama, Sapporo, Kobe, Hamamatsu, Nagoya, Osaka

Venues
Yokohama : Yokohama Arena (12,000)
Sapporo : Hokkaido Prefectural Sports Center (8,000)
Kobe : Kobe Green Arena (6,000)
Hamamatsu : Hamamatsu Arena (8,200)
Nagoya : Nippon Gaishi Hall (10,000)
Osaka : Osaka Municipal Central Gymnasium (8,000)

Attendance
 Matches played : 103
 Attendance (first round) (played 60) : 100,705 (1,678 per match)
 Attendance (second round) (played 32) : 53,410 (1,669 per match)
 Attendance (third round) (played 6) : 22,250 (3,708 per match)
 Attendance (final round) (played 5) : 48,050 (9,610 per match)
 Total attendance on tournament : 224,415 (2,179 per match)
 Most attendance : 11,500 -  v. , Yokohama Arena, Yokohama on 19 October 2018.11,500 -  v. , Yokohama Arena, Yokohama on 20 October 2018.
 Fewest attendance : 160 -  v. , Osaka Municipal Central Gymnasium, Osaka on 11 October 2018.

Matches
 Most matches lost : 8 - 
 Longest match played (duration) : 158 min. -  vs.  (2h,38m)
 Shortest match played (duration) : 58 min. -  vs.  (0h,58m)

Sets
 Total sets (first round)  : 201 (3.35 per match)
 Total sets (second round)  : 116 (3.63 per match)
 Total sets (third round)  : 26 (4.33 per match)
 Total sets (final round)  : 21 (4.20 per match)
 Total sets  scored : 364 (3.53 per match)
 Most sets played : 49 - 
 Most sets wins : 36 - , 
 Fewest sets wins : 0 - 
 Most sets lost : 24 - 
 Fewest sets lost : 10 - 
 Most 5 sets lost : 3 - ,  (1/3)
 Highest set ratio : 3.400 -  (34/10)
 Lowest set ratio : 0.000 -  (0/15)

Points
 Total points (first round)  : 8,626 (144 per match)
 Total points (second round)  : 5,056 (158 per match)
 Total points (third round)  : 1,123 (187 per match)
 Total points (final round)  : 934 (187 per match)
 Total points scored  : 15,739 (153 per match)
 Most points wins : 1144 - 
 Fewest points wins : 231 - 
 Most points lost : 1011 - 
 Fewest points lost : 363 - 
 Most points played in match : 222 -  vs.  2 : 3 (105/117)
 Fewest points played in match : 102 -  vs.  3 : 0 (75/27)
 Highest points score in set (excluding 5th set) : 62 -  vs.  (30/32),  vs.  (32/30),  vs.  (30/32)
 Lowest points score in set (excluding 5th set) : 27 -  vs.  (75/27)
 Highest points ratio : 1.215 -  (790/650)
 Lowest points ratio : 0.631 -  (231/366)

Squads

Teams 
Total teams : 24
Total players : 336 (14 per team)

Players 
 Appearance record: Karina Ocasio  participated in the World Championship for the fifth time.

Multiple World Championships

Final standing
 Champions   Runners up   Third place   Fourth place

|- 
|colspan=12| 5th place match

|- 
|colspan=12| Teams eliminated in second round

|- 
|colspan=12| Teams eliminated in first round

|}
Source: WCH 2018 final standings

Statistics leaders

The statistics of each group follows the vis reports P2 and P3. The statistics include 6 volleyball skills; serve, reception, set, spike, block, and dig. The table below shows the top 5 ranked players in each skill plus top scorers at the completion of the tournament.

Awards

 Most Valuable Player
  Tijana Bošković
 Best Setter
  Ofelia Malinov
 Best Outside Spikers
  Miriam Sylla
  Zhu Ting

 Best Middle Blockers
  Yan Ni
  Milena Rašić
 Best Opposite Spiker
  Paola Egonu
 Best Libero
  Monica De Gennaro

See also

2018 FIVB Volleyball Men's World Championship statistics
FIVB Volleyball Women's Nations League statistics
FIVB Volleyball Men's Nations League statistics
Volleyball records and statistics
Major achievements in volleyball by nation
List of Indoor Volleyball World Medalists

References

External links
Fédération Internationale de Volleyball – official website
2018 Women's World Championship – official website
Teams
Competition Formula
History
Honours
Previous Editions

statistics
Volleyball records and statistics